Deione is a genus of Asian orb-weaver spiders first described by Tamerlan Thorell in 1898.

Species
 it contains six species:
Deione cheni Mi & Li, 2021 – China
Deione lingulata Han, Zhu & Levi, 2009 – China
Deione ovata Mi, Peng & Yin, 2010 – China
Deione renaria Mi, Peng & Yin, 2010 – China
Deione thoracica Thorell, 1898 – Myanmar
Deione yangi Mi & Li, 2021 – China

References

Araneidae
Araneomorphae genera
Spiders of Asia
Taxa named by Tamerlan Thorell